Sexual orientation, gender identity, and military service may refer to:
 Sexual orientation and gender identity in military service
 Sexual orientation and gender identity in the Australian military
 Sexual orientation and gender identity in the United States military
 Sexual orientation and gender identity in the Israeli military

See also
 Sexual orientation and military service
 Transgender people and military service
 Intersex people and military service

Military science